The Harptones are an American doo-wop group, which formed in Manhattan in 1953.

The group never had a top forty pop hit, or a record on the US Billboard R&B chart, yet they are known for both their lead singer Willie Winfield and their pianist/arranger, Raoul Cita. The Harptones recorded for Coed Records and other labels. The Harptones may have been the first doo-wop group to have a full-time arranger among their members, and Cita knew how to work to Winfield's strengths. Their best-known recordings include "A Sunday Kind of Love" (1953), "Why Should I Love You?" (1954), "Life is But a Dream" (1955), "The Shrine of St. Cecilia" (1956), and "What Will I Tell My Heart" (1961).

In 1956, they recorded some songs for the film Rockin' the Blues: "Mambo Boogie", "Ou Wee Baby", and "High Flying Baby".

The song "Life is But a Dream" was featured in the 1990 film GoodFellas, and can be found on the film's soundtrack album.

Members

1951–1954
Willie Winfield (lead)
Billy Brown (bass)
Claudie "Nicky" Clark (first tenor)
William Dempsey (second tenor)
William "Dicey" Galloway (baritone)
Raoul Cita (piano; baritone)

Early 1955
Willie Winfield (lead)
Billy Brown (bass)
Claudie "Nicky" Clark (first tenor)
William Dempsey (second tenor)
Freddy Taylor (baritone)
Raoul Cita (piano; baritone)

Dicey Galloway was drafted in November 1954.

Late 1955
Willie Winfield (tenor)
Billy Brown (bass)
Claudie "Nicky" Clark
William Dempsey (second tenor)
Bernard "Jimmy" Beckum (baritone)
Raoul Cita (piano; baritone)

Early 1956
Willie Winfield (tenor)
Bobby Spencer
William Dempsey (second tenor)
Bernard "Jimmy" Beckum (baritone)
Raoul Cita (piano; baritone)

1956 movie Rockin' The Blues
Willie Winfield (tenor)
Freddy Taylor
Billy Brown
William Dempsey (second tenor)
Raoul Cita (piano; baritone)

Early 1957
Willie Winfield (tenor)
Billy Brown
William Dempsey (second tenor)
William "Dicey" Galloway
Toni Williams
Raoul Cita (piano; baritone)

Billy Brown died of a drug overdose in spring 1957.

Late 1958
Willie Winfield (tenor)
William Dempsey (second tenor)
William "Dicey" Galloway
Toni Williams
Curtis Cherebin

Dicey Galloway left in October and was replaced by Milton Love of The Solitares for a short time, before splitting. Galloway died on July 18, 2017 in Houghs Neck, Quincy, Massachusetts, at age 84 after suffering from multiple illnesses.

1959–1963
Willie Winfield
Nicky Clark
William Dempsey
Curtis Cherebin
Raoul Cita

Nicky Clark left after a few months, to be replaced by Wilbur "Yonkie" Paul, who was in turn replaced by Hank "Pompi" Jernigan.

Early 1964
Willie Winfield
Nicky Clark
William Dempsey
Jimmy Beckum
Raoul Cita

Late 1964
Nicky Clark
William Dempsey
Curtis Cherebin
Hank "Pompi" Jernigan
Raoul Cita
Nicky Clark Died In July 1978, at the age of 43.

1970–1972
Willie Winfield
Curtis Cherebin
Jimmy Beckum
William Dempsey
Raoul Cita

1972–mid-1990s
Willie Winfield
Marlowe Murray
Linda Champion
Raoul Cita

Mid 1990s–1999
Willie Winfield
Marlowe Murray
Linda Champion
William Dempsey
Raoul Cita

This line-up appeared on Doo Wop 50. Linda Champion left due to health problems around 2000.

2000–2008
Willie Winfield
Marlowe Murray
Vicki Burgess
William Dempsey
Raoul Cita

2008–2014
Willie Winfield
Don Cruz
Vicki Burgess
William Dempsey
Raoul Cita
 Tommie Shider

Marlowe Murray died on December 11th 2008, from cancer, at the age of 73.

Raoul J. Cita died on December 13, 2014, from liver and stomach cancer, at the age of 86.

Willie Winfield died from a heart attack on July 27, 2021, aged 91. William Dempsey is the only original surviving member of The Harptones.

Awards and recognition
The Harptones were featured more times than any other group in the United in Group Harmony Association's official top 500 vocal group recordings list, compiled 1996–2000. They were inducted into The Vocal Group Hall of Fame in 2002.

References

External links
 Harptones official web site
 Article about The Harptones by Marv Goldberg
 Article about The Harptones by J.C. Marion

 
'The Harptones' Vocal Group Hall of Fame Page
 

1953 establishments in New York City
2014 disestablishments in New York (state)
Apex Records artists
Coed Records artists
Cub Records artists
Doo-wop groups
Musical groups established in 1953
Musical groups disestablished in 2014